Paul Harold Derr (June 15, 1903 – March 12, 1976) was a collegiate American football and track and field coach.
He served as the head football coach at Lawrence University in Appleton, Wisconsin from 1935 to 1937. He served later served as a track coach at North Carolina State University.

References

External links
 NC State historical profile
 

1903 births
1976 deaths
Illinois Fighting Illini baseball players
Lawrence Vikings football coaches
NC State Wolfpack track and field coaches